Narrative Journalism, also referred to as literary journalism, is defined as creative nonfiction that contains accurate, well-researched information. It is related to immersion journalism, where a writer follows a subject or theme for a long period of time (weeks or months) and details an individual's experiences from a deeply personal perspective.

History
One of the first "non-fiction" novels of investigative journalism was Operación Masacre, completed in 1957 by the Argentinean Rodolfo Walsh. Truman Capote's In Cold Blood (1966) was one of the first English-language examples of the genre, and it has since been established as a historic example of narrative journalism in novel form. Capote demonstrated to writers the possibility of using creative techniques while retaining the guidelines of journalism.

Though Capote claims to have invented this new form of journalism (i.e., "New Journalism"), the origins of literary journalism can be traced much earlier. Characteristics of narrative journalism can be found in Daniel Defoe's writing in the 18th century, as well as in writings of Mark Twain in the 19th century and James Agee, Ernest Hemingway, and John Steinbeck in the early to mid-20th century. For example, Jack London's investigative reporting on poverty in The People of the Abyss (1903) is often seen as an early example of narrative journalism, as London—disguised as a tramp—is both an active participant in and the author of the narrative.

Capote's contemporary Tom Wolfe wrote The New Journalism in 1974 and is credited with popularizing discussion on the appropriateness of narrative in journalism. He cites Gay Talese as the "father" of New Journalism in "The Gay Talese Reader," arguing that Talese exemplifies the foundations of narrative journalism.

Today, many nonfiction novels use narrative journalism to tell their stories. Print publications such as Harper's, The New Yorker, Esquire, Rolling Stone, and The Village Voice are also welcome homes to narrative journalists.

Many mainstream newspaper publications are still wary of supporting narrative journalism due to time and space constraints, though some will print an occasional narrative in Sunday features or a supplemental magazine.

Definitions of Narrative Journalism 
The definitions of narrative journalism vary. Some prefer to refer to the genre as "literary journalism" to emphasize the use of literary devices or techniques, while others use the broad term "creative non-fiction" to distinguish the genre from "hard" journalism. Simply put, narrative is the way in which a story is constructed through a particular point of view and arrangement of events. The Nieman Program on Narrative Journalism, launched in 2001, aims to provide a center for the teaching, learning, and practice of narrative journalism. The Nieman Foundation defines narrative journalism as more than simply telling stories: it is a complex genre with multiple layers and contexts that, when done well, has the capacity to reform newspapers and make them essential and compelling. Broadly speaking, some critical elements of narrative journalism include the following:

 It contains accurate, well-researched information and is interesting to read.
 It looks at intriguing people, human emotions, and real situations. It provides the private story behind the public story.
 It reaches past the ordinary by blending the reportage of facts with the writing style of fiction.

Mark Kramer, former director of the Nieman Program on Narrative Journalism, says it is “journalism that doesn’t assume the reader is a robot, that acknowledges the reader knows lots and feels and snickers and gets wild.” Kramer stresses the importance of voice. Readers have their coffee with the newspaper in the morning, he says. They want to understand and even identify with the news voice; but regular news reporting is anonymous and restrained, leaving the reader feeling lonely. When you have an audience made up of so many disparate sorts of people it seems noble to appeal to the lowest common denominator and just talk about the facts. But what happens is depersonalization of the news voice – narrative journalism aims to put the human voice back at the breakfast table. Kramer defines narrative journalism as writing that contains the following elements:

 Set scenes;
 Characters;
 Action that unfolds over time;
 Voice that has personality;
 A relationship with the audience; and
 Destination – a theme, a purpose, and a reason.

Online narrative journalism
One high-profile example of the effective use of narrative journalism online can be found in the Philadelphia Inquirers nonfiction serial "Black Hawk Down". The 1997 online newspaper series chronicled the American raid of Mogadishu and based their stories on interviews with the soldiers who fought in the battle. The story became part illustrated book, part documentary and part radio program and allowed readers to explore the story in depth.

With the availability of free publishing online today, narrative journalism has become a popular form used by writers eager to give their personal perspectives on noteworthy events and public issues.

Salon and Slate are two of the most popular forums for narrative journalism. Other sites devoted to this craft include Creative Nonfiction and Atlantic Unbound, and with the increasing popularity of citizen journalism there exists potential for more to explore on the scene to cater to a variety of niches.

Six Billion, founded in 2003, was an online magazine of narrative journalism that attempted to tackle an issue from several perspectives. Each issue (themed by one topic such as "Battleground States" or "Veterans of Foreign Wars") featured stories told in text, film/video, photography, sound, illustration, and interactive media.

Issues with narrative journalism
"A narrative does not depart from the cardinal rule: Make nothing up or you'll be out of here and working at the Sunglass Hut so fast it'll make your head spin around. A narrative is a journalistic form that has fallen into considerable disfavor in the wake of our craft's ceaseless, self-flagellating credibility crisis" — Patrick Beach, Austin American-Statesman.

Since so much of narrative journalism is based on a writer reconstructing his or her experiences, many professionals in the news industry find themselves wary of using this technique because it is often harder to verify facts within the story. In a post-Jayson Blair era, those concerned with the ethics of honest reporting and writing are cautious of journalistic storytelling that may be manipulating facts to make the reader more emotionally invested.

Also, narrative journalism has not yet found a definite home in the newsroom because of the nature of news reporting. Long-form journalism is something that most journalists are not trained for, and incredible hard-news beat reporters are not necessarily great storytellers.

Narrative journalism cannot be practiced in every setting.

References

External links
Writing History: Capote's novel – A Lawerence Journal World article on the impact of Truman Capote's novel
Black Hawk Down The Philadelphia Inquirer's serial about the raid on Mogadishu
https://web.archive.org/web/20091203002252/http://www.nieman.harvard.edu/narrative/home.aspx – Harvard's Narrative Journalism program

Types of journalism